* is an asterisk, a typographical symbol or glyph.

* may also refer to:

Art, entertainment, and media
 "*", a song by M83
 "Asterisk" (song) or "*: Asterisk", by Orange Range
 "*", a song by Sadist from Lego
 *, the logo for the alternative rock band the Red Hot Chili Peppers

Other uses
 *, a symbol for not out in cricket
 *, a symbol identifying a genetic lineage as a paragroup of a specified haplogroup
 Star (game theory), the value given to the game where both players have only the option of moving to the zero game
 *, in linguistics, a symbol that prefixes a word or phrase that, in historical linguistics, is a reconstructed form for which no actual examples have been found
 Also a hypothetical, deviant, or ungrammatical  form
 *, a symbol in several astronomical notation nomenclatures for abbreviating star
 *, the symbol is used to refer a reader to a footnote 
 *, the symbol is used to refer a reader to an endnote
 *, the beginning of a vertical service code in telephony
 *, the wildcard character in a computer terminal window or terminal or computer programming, representation of any word, words or characters. 
 * (CONFIG.SYS directive)

See also
 Blackstar (album), a 2016 album by David Bowie, stylized as ★
*Star, an abstract strategy game
 Asterisk (disambiguation)
 Star (disambiguation)
 ** (disambiguation)